Ligush (also Romanized as Līgūsh) is a village in Tavabe-e Kojur Rural District, Kojur District, Nowshahr County, Mazandaran Province, Iran. At the 2006 census, its population was 79, in 22 families.

References 

Populated places in Nowshahr County